The March 732 was a British open-wheel Formula 2 racing car, built by March Engineering and introduced in 1973. It was powered by the  BMW M12/7 engine. It's Formula Atlantic equivalent, the March 73B, was based on the 732. Frenchman Jean-Pierre Jarier eventually won the 1973 European Formula Two Championship driving a March 732, finishing the season with 8 wins, 9 podium finishes, 4 pole positions, 4 fastest laps, and 78 points.

References

Formula Two cars
March vehicles
Open wheel racing cars